Terry Christie (born 1942/1943) is a Scottish former football player and manager. He last managed Alloa Athletic.

Career
Christie played as a full back and winger for Dundee, Raith Rovers, Hawick Royal Albert, Stirling Albion and Newtongrange Star.

He later became a manager and was in charge of Newtongrange Star, Meadowbank Thistle, Stenhousemuir and Alloa Athletic. Christie won the 1995 Scottish Challenge Cup Final while manager of Stenhousemuir. While working part-time as a manager, Christie was also headteacher of Musselburgh Grammar School.

Honours

Manager
Stenhousemuir
Scottish Challenge Cup 1995–96

Alloa Athletic
Scottish Challenge Cup 1999–2000

References

1940s births
Living people
Scottish footballers
Scottish football managers
Dundee F.C. players
Raith Rovers F.C. players
Hawick Royal Albert F.C. players
Stirling Albion F.C. players
Newtongrange Star F.C. players
Livingston F.C. managers
Stenhousemuir F.C. managers
Alloa Athletic F.C. managers
Scottish Football League players
Association football fullbacks
Association football wingers
Heads of schools in Scotland
Scottish Junior Football Association managers
Newtongrange Star F.C. managers